Aproaerema longihamata is a moth of the family Gelechiidae. It was described by Hou-Hun Li in 1993. It is found in China.

References

Moths described in 1993
Aproaerema
Moths of Asia